War Book is a 2014 British political drama film directed by Tom Harper and written by Jack Thorne. The film features an ensemble cast, consisting of Adeel Akhtar, Nicholas Burns, Ben Chaplin, Shaun Evans, Kerry Fox, Phoebe Fox, Sophie Okonedo, Antony Sher (In his final film role before his death in 2021), and Nathan Stewart-Jarrett.

Plot
Over the course of three days, eight government officials, a Member of Parliament, and a political appointee participate in a war-game which has taken place regularly among British civil servants since the 1960s, as a way to help them formulate government procedure in the event of nuclear war. In the depicted meetings, set in 2014, the group discusses possible UK policy in the fictional event of a nuclear detonation in Mumbai, India by a Pakistani organisation.

Cast
 Adeel Akhtar as Mo
 Nicholas Burns as James
 Ben Chaplin as Gary
 Shaun Evans as Tom
 Kerry Fox as Maria
 Phoebe Fox as Kate
 Sophie Okonedo as Philippa
 Antony Sher as David
 Nathan Stewart-Jarrett as Austin
 Morgan Walters as Frank

Premiere and reception
The film was first shown on 13 October 2014, during the London Film Festival, saw a limited cinema release on 7 August 2015, and premiered on BBC Four only four days later, on 11 August 2015.

On review aggregator Rotten Tomatoes, the film holds an approval rating of 75% based on 8 reviews, with an average rating of 7.67/10. Variety's Charles Gant found the film's dialogue somewhat theatrical and compared it to Roger Donaldson’s Thirteen Days, which proved that "a talkathon rooted in a historical moment of genuine peril can be far more gripping than any invented drama, and many audiences may find the final act of "War Book" to be risibly paranoid by comparison." The Guardians Mike McCahill felt that "theatricality looms, but the variation of voices and viewpoints among the expert cast generates a rat-a-tat momentum." The Lists Nikki Baughan was much more enthusiastic, comparing it to Sidney Lumet's 1957 classic Twelve Angry Men, stating that "Jack Thorne's remarkable script is a masterclass in slow-burn tension, combining black-and-white facts with the murky greys of human emotion to drive home the fragility of social order in the face of incoming warheads."

References

External links
 
 
 

2014 films
2010s political drama films
British political drama films
Films set in 2014
Films directed by Tom Harper
2014 drama films
Films with screenplays by Jack Thorne
2010s English-language films
2010s British films